María Teresa Espasa Moltó is a Spanish Valencian poet, essayist and professor. She was born in Dénia, Marina Alta, Alicante) in the middle of the 20th century. She is known for her intense and animated literary and cultural style developed during the talk show "La Buhardilla" and through the magazine, Corondel.

Selected works 
 A través del silencio (Adelapos, 1978)
 Ensueño poético a cuatro voces (I.B. El Clot, Valencia, 1988)
 Desierto articulado (La Buhardilla, 1992)
 El bazar de los insomnios (Germania, 1994)
 El gesto habitual de la torpeza (Canente Libros, 1997)
 De la ilusión del amor a la pérdida del tiempo (Páginacero, 1998)
 El tiempo se acaba (Páginacero, 1998), escrito en colaboración con Elena Torres.
 El ocio de la gaviota (Páginacero, 1999)
 Cuando puedas llama (Premio Vila de Mislata, 1999)
 Aquellos días perdidos (Páginacero, 2002)
 En el nombre de cada día (Aristas de Cobre, 2005)
 Poemas de Nueva York (Corondel, 2005)
 Diario de sombras (Brosquil, 2006)
 Poemas dispersos (Páginacero, 2009)
 Tiempo para el recuerdo (Biblioteca Valenciana, Generalitat Valenciana, 2011)
 El congreso (Andrómina, 2012)
 Tanto y tanto silencio. Antología poética (Ediciones Vitrubio, 2014)

Inclusion in anthologies 
 Las flores idílicas (Málaga, 1998)
 Partida de Damas (Museo de Bellas Artes, Valencia, 1999)
 Antología Grupo Poético Corondel (Corona del Sur,  Málaga, 2000)
 Las flores del yodo (Generalidad Valenciana, 2001)
 El rapto de Europa (Fundación Max Aub, 2004)
 Caminos de la palabra. De Max Aub al Quijote (Fundación Max Aub, 2005)
 Final de entrega (Córdoba 2006)
 Mapa. 30 Poetas valencianos en la democracia (Carena, 2009)
 Celebración de la palabra (Institució Alfons el Magnànim, 2010)
 Trato Preferente. Voces esenciales de la poesía actual en español (Sial, 2010)
 Latidos contra la violencia de género (Ed. Ateneo Blasco Ibáñez, 2012)
 Los que no tienen voz dentro de El limonero de Homero III (Páginacero, 2013)
 Poética en Gredos (Alkaid, 2013).

Awards 
 Premio Vila de Mislata (1999): Cuando puedas llama
 XI Premio de Poesía Leonor de Córdoba (2012): El congreso
 Premio de la Asociación Valenciana de Escritores y Críticos Literarios (CLAVE) a la trayectoria poética (2015)

References

Bibliography

External links
María Teresa Espasa at Junta de Andalucía. Consejería de Cultura. Agencia Andaluza de Instituciones Culturales (in Spanish)
 

20th-century Spanish poets
21st-century Spanish poets
Spanish women poets
People from Valencia
Spanish women essayists
21st-century Spanish writers
20th-century essayists
21st-century essayists
Year of birth missing (living people)
Living people
20th-century Spanish women writers
21st-century Spanish women writers